Grevillea acerata, is a plant in the family Proteaceae and which is endemic to New South Wales. It is a spreading shrub with more or less linear leaves and groups of woolly cream-coloured to grey flowers in groups on the ends of the branches. It is similar to Grevillea sphacelata and is only known from the Gibraltar Range National Park and nearby Glen Elgin.

Description
The edges of the leaves are rolled under and partly or completely cover the lower surface which is covered with silky to woolly hairs. The flowers are arranged in more or less spherical groups  in diameter on the ends of branches. The tepals are covered with woolly hairs which are grey to cream-coloured and rusty-coloured near the base of the flower. Flowering occurs in spring and sporadically throughout the rest of the year. The fruit that follows is a hairy, oval-shaped, wrinkled follicle long.

This grevillea is similar to both Grevillea sphacelata and G. buxifolia.

Taxonomy and naming
Grevillea acerata was first formally described in 1986 by Donald McGillivray from a specimen collected in the Gibraltar Range National Park in 1973. The description was published in McGillivray's book "New Names in Grevillea (Proteaceae)". The specific epithet (acerata) is a Latin word meaning "mingled with chaff".

Distribution and habitat
This grevillea grows in woodland, forest and heath in soils derived from granite. It is only known from the Gibraltar Range National Park and nearby Glen Elgin.

References

acerata
Flora of New South Wales
Proteales of Australia
Plants described in 1986
Taxa named by Donald McGillivray